Al-Muhajir ibn Abi Umayya ibn al-Mughira ibn Abd Allah was a companion of the Islamic prophet Muhammad from the Banu Makhzum clan and a Muslim commander active in Yemen during the Ridda wars (632–633).

Life
Al-Muhajir's birth name was al-Walid until it was changed to al-Muhajir (the Emigrant) by Muhammad; the latter noted that one of the Pharaohs bore the name al-Walid and that the name was used so excessively by the Banu Makhzum clan of the Quraysh tribe to which al-Muhajir belonged that it practically became a deity of the clan.

Al-Muhajir's father was Abu Umayya Suhayl, a son of al-Mughira ibn Abd Allah, a prominent pre-Islamic leader of the Makhzum in Mecca. Abu Umayya was well known for his generosity to traveling companions on the road and was popularly known as Zad al-Rakb (Provider for the Passengers). Al-Muhajir's mother was Atika bint Amir from the Firas clan of the Kinana tribe, which was noted for its martial prowess. Al-Muhajir's sister was Umm Salama, one of the wives of Muhammad. He was a paternal first cousin of Khalid ibn al-Walid.

Muhammad appointed al-Muhajir as the tax collector over the Yemenite tribes of Kinda (specifically its Banu Mu'awiya branch) and Sadif. He married Asma bint al-Nu'man ibn Abi al-Jawn, a Kindite noblewoman and former wife of Muhammad; she later married al-Muhajir's Makhzumite kinsman Ikrima ibn Abi Jahl. In 631 Muhammad appointed al-Muhajir governor of Yemen's principal city Sana'a. He did not take up the post, remaining in Medina until the accession of Caliph Abu Bakr in 632.

Abu Bakr dispatched al-Muhajir to reinforce the governor of Yemen, Ziyad ibn Labid al-Ansari, and suppress the rebellion of the Banu Mu'awiya clan of Kinda in Hadhramawt (south Arabian coastal region) during the Ridda wars. The Kinda was ultimately surrendered to al-Muhajir and Ikrima.

References

Bibliography

7th century in Yemen
Banu Makhzum
Generals of the Rashidun Caliphate
Companions of the Prophet
People of the Ridda Wars
Governors of the Rashidun Caliphate